Gothic is an extinct East Germanic language that was spoken by the Goths. It is known primarily from the Codex Argenteus, a 6th-century copy of a 4th-century Bible translation, and is the only East Germanic language with a sizeable text corpus.  All others, including Burgundian and Vandalic, are known, if at all, only from proper names that survived in historical accounts, and from loanwords in other languages such as Portuguese, Spanish, Catalan, Occitan and French.

As a Germanic language, Gothic is a part of the Indo-European language family. It is the earliest Germanic language that is attested in any sizable texts, but it lacks any modern descendants. The oldest documents in Gothic date back to the fourth century. The language was in decline by the mid-sixth century, partly because of the military defeat of the Goths at the hands of the Franks, the elimination of the Goths in Italy, and geographic isolation (in Spain, the Gothic language lost its last and probably already declining function as a church language when the Visigoths converted from Arianism to Nicene Christianity in 589). 
The language survived as a domestic language in the Iberian peninsula (modern-day Spain and Portugal) as late as the eighth century. Gothic-seeming terms are found in manuscripts subsequent to this date, but these may or may not belong to the same language. In particular, a language known as Crimean Gothic survived in the lower Danube area and in isolated mountain regions in Crimea as late as the second half of the 18th century. Lacking certain sound changes characteristic of Gothic, however, Crimean Gothic cannot be a lineal descendant of Bible Gothic.

The existence of such early attested texts makes it a language of considerable interest in comparative linguistics.

History and evidence

Only a few documents in Gothic have survived – not enough for a  complete reconstruction of the language. Most Gothic-language sources are translations or glosses of other languages (namely,  Greek), so foreign linguistic elements most certainly influenced the texts. These are the primary sources:

 The largest body of surviving documentation consists of various codices, mostly from the sixth century, copying the Bible translation that was commissioned by the Arian bishop Ulfilas (Wulfila, 311–382), leader of a community of  Visigothic Christians in the Roman province of Moesia (modern-day Serbia, Bulgaria/Romania). He commissioned a translation into the Gothic language of the Greek Bible, of which translation roughly three-quarters of the New Testament and some fragments of the Old Testament have survived. The extant translated texts, produced by several scholars, are collected in the following codices:
Codex Argenteus (Uppsala), including the Speyer fragment: 188 leaves
The best-preserved Gothic manuscript, dating from the sixth century, it was preserved and transmitted by northern Ostrogoths in modern-day Italy. It contains a large portion of the four synoptic gospels. Since it is a translation from Greek, the language of the Codex Argenteus is replete with borrowed Greek words and Greek usages. The syntax in particular is often copied directly from the Greek.
 Codex Ambrosianus (Milan) and the Codex Taurinensis (Turin): Five parts, totaling 193 leaves
It contains scattered passages from the New Testament (including parts of the gospels and the Epistles), from the Old Testament ( Nehemiah), and some commentaries known as Skeireins. The text likely had been somewhat modified by copyists.
Codex Gissensis (Gießen): One leaf with fragments of Luke 23–24 (apparently a Gothic-Latin diglot) was found in an excavation in  Arsinoë in Egypt in 1907 and was destroyed by water damage in 1945, after copies had already been made by researchers.
Codex Carolinus (Wolfenbüttel): Four leaves, fragments of Romans 11–15 (a Gothic-Latin diglot).
 Codex Vaticanus Latinus 5750 (Vatican City): Three leaves, pages 57–58, 59–60, and 61–62 of the Skeireins. This is a fragment of  Codex Ambrosianus E.
Gothica Bononiensia (also known as the Codex Bononiensis), a palimpsest fragment, discovered in 2009, of two folios with what appears to be a sermon, containing besides non-biblical text a number of direct Bible quotes and allusions, both from previously attested parts of the Gothic Bible (the text is clearly taken from Ulfilas' translation) and from previously unattested ones (e.g., Psalms, Genesis).
 Fragmenta Pannonica (also known as the Hács-Béndekpuszta fragments or Tabella Hungarica), which consist of fragments of a  1 mm thick lead plate with remnants of verses from the Gospels.
 A scattering of old documents: two deeds (the Naples and Arezzo deeds, on papyri), alphabets (in the Gothica Vindobonensia and the Gothica Parisina), a calendar (in the Codex Ambrosianus A), glosses found in a number of manuscripts and a few runic inscriptions (between three and 13) that are known or suspected to be Gothic: some scholars believe that these inscriptions are not at all Gothic.  Krause thought that several names in an Indian inscription were possibly Gothic. Furthermore, late ninth-century Christian inscriptions using the Gothic alphabet, not runes, and copying or mimicking biblical Gothic orthography, have been found at Mangup in Crimea. 
 A small dictionary of more than 80 words and an untranslated song, compiled by the Fleming Ogier Ghiselin de Busbecq, the Habsburg ambassador to the court of the Ottoman Empire in Constantinople from 1555 to 1562. Busbecq was curious to find out about the language, and by arrangement met two speakers of Crimean Gothic and listed the terms in his compilation Turkish Letters: dating from nearly a millennium after Ulfilas, these terms are not representative of Ulfilas' language. Busbecq's material contains many puzzles and enigmas and is difficult to interpret in the light of comparative Germanic linguistics.

Reports of the discovery of other parts of Ulfilas' Bible have not been substantiated. Heinrich May in 1968 claimed to have found in England twelve leaves of a palimpsest containing parts of the Gospel of Matthew.

Only fragments of the Gothic translation of the Bible have been preserved. The translation was apparently done in the Balkans region by people in close contact with Greek Christian culture. The Gothic Bible apparently was used by the Visigoths in southern France until the loss of Visigothic France at the start of the 6th century, in Visigothic Iberia until about 700, and perhaps for a time in Italy, the Balkans, and Ukraine. In the latter country at Mangup, ninth-century inscriptions have been found of a prayer in the Gothic alphabet using biblical Gothic orthography. During the extermination of Arianism, Trinitarian Christians probably overwrote many texts in Gothic as palimpsests, or alternatively collected and burned Gothic documents. Apart from biblical texts, the only substantial Gothic document that still exists - and the only lengthy text known to have been composed originally in the Gothic language - is the Skeireins, a few pages of commentary on the Gospel of John.

Very few medieval secondary sources make reference to the Gothic language after about 800. In De incrementis ecclesiae Christianae (840–842), Walafrid Strabo, a Frankish monk who lived in Swabia, writes of a group of monks who reported that even then certain peoples in Scythia (Dobruja), especially around Tomis, spoke a sermo Theotiscus ('Germanic language'), the language of the Gothic translation of the Bible, and that they used such a liturgy.

Many writers of the medieval texts that mention the Goths used the word Goths to mean any Germanic people in eastern Europe (such as the Varangians), many of whom certainly did not use the Gothic language as known from the Gothic Bible. Some writers even referred to Slavic-speaking people as "Goths". However, it is clear from Ulfilas' translation that - despite some puzzles - the Gothic language belongs with the Germanic language-group, not with Slavic.

The relationship between the language of the Crimean Goths and Ulfilas' Gothic is less clear. The few fragments of Crimean Gothic from the 16th century show significant differences from the language of the Gothic Bible, although some of the glosses, such as ada for "egg", could indicate a common heritage, and Gothic mēna ("moon"), compared to Crimean Gothic mine,  suggests an East Germanic connection.

Generally, the term "Gothic language" refers to the language of Ulfilas, but the attestations themselves date largely from the 6th century, long after Ulfilas had died.

Alphabet and transliteration

A few Gothic runic inscriptions were found across Europe, but due to early Christianization of the Goths, the Runic writing was quickly replaced by the newly invented Gothic alphabet.

Ulfilas's Gothic, as well as that of the Skeireins and various other manuscripts, was written using an alphabet that was most likely invented by Ulfilas himself for his translation.  Some scholars (such as Braune) claim that it was derived from the Greek alphabet only while others maintain that there are some Gothic letters of Runic or Latin origin.

A standardized system is used for transliterating Gothic words into the Latin script. The system mirrors the conventions of the native alphabet, such as writing long  as ei.  The Goths used their equivalents of e and o alone only for long higher vowels, using the digraphs ai and au (much as in French) for the corresponding short or lower vowels. There are two variant spelling systems: a "raw" one that directly transliterates the original Gothic script and a "normalized" one that adds diacritics (macrons and acute accents) to certain vowels to clarify the pronunciation or, in certain cases, to indicate the Proto-Germanic origin of the vowel in question. The latter system is usually used in the academic literature.

The following table shows the correspondence between spelling and sound for vowels:

Notes:
 This "normalised transliteration" system devised by Jacob Grimm is used in some modern editions of Gothic texts and in studies of Common Germanic. It signals distinctions not made by Ulfilas in his alphabet. Rather, they reflect various origins in Proto-Germanic. Thus,
 ái is used for the sound derived from the Proto-Germanic diphthong ai. Some scholars have considered this sound to have remained as a diphthong in Gothic. However, Ulfilas was highly consistent in other spelling inventions, which makes it unlikely that he assigned two different sounds to the same digraph. Furthermore, he consistently used the digraph to represent Greek , which was then certainly a monophthong. A monophthongal value is accepted by Eduard Prokosch in his influential A Common Germanic Grammar. It had earlier been accepted by Joseph Wright but only in an appendix to his Grammar of the Gothic Language.
 ai is used for the sound derived from the Common Germanic long vowel ē before a vowel.
 áu is used for the sound derived from Common Germanic diphthong au. It cannot be related to a Greek digraph, since  then represented a sequence of a vowel and a spirant (fricative) consonant, which Ulfilas transcribed as aw in representing Greek words. Nevertheless, the argument based on simplicity is accepted by some influential scholars.
The "normal environment of occurrence" refers to native words. In foreign words, these environments are often greatly disturbed. In foreign borrowings, however,  and  occur freely in all environments, reflecting the corresponding vowel quality in the source language.
Paradigmatic alterations can occur either intra-paradigm (between two different forms within a specific paradigm) or cross-paradigm (between the same form in two different paradigms of the same class).  Examples of intra-paradigm alternation are   "district" vs.   "district";   "maiden" vs.   "maiden";   "maiden" vs.   "maiden";   "deed" vs.   "deed";   "corpse" vs.   "corpses";  ?? "tree" vs.   "tree";   "to do" vs.   "I/he did";   "to judge" vs.   "I/he judged".  Examples of cross-paradigm alternation are Class IV verbs   "to come" vs.   "to carry, to bear",   "(having) come" vs.   "(having) carried"; Class VIIb verbs   "to let" vs.   "to sow" (note similar preterites   "I/he let",   "I/he sowed"). A combination of intra- and cross-paradigm alternation occurs in Class V   "to hasten" vs.   "I/he hastened" (expected *snaw, compare  "to come",  "I/he came").
Various possibilities have been suggested (for example, high central or high back unrounded vowels, such as ); under these theories, the spelling of iu is derived from the fact that the sound alternates with iw before a vowel, based on the similar alternations au and aw. The most common theory, however, simply posits  as the pronunciation of iu.
Macrons represent long ā and ū (however, long i appears as ei, following the representation used in the native alphabet). Macrons are often also used in the case of ē and ō; however, they are sometimes omitted since these vowels are always long. Long ā occurs only before the consonants ,  and represents Proto-Germanic nasalized  < earlier ; non-nasal  did not occur in Proto-Germanic. It is possible that the Gothic vowel still preserved the nasalization, or else that the nasalization was lost but the length distinction kept, as has happened with Lithuanian . Non-nasal  and  occurred in Proto-Germanic, however, and so long ei and ū occur in all contexts.

The following table shows the correspondence between spelling and sound for consonants:

, which is written with a single character in the native alphabet, is transliterated using the symbol ƕ, which is used only in transliterating Gothic.
 is similarly written with a single character in the native alphabet and is transliterated q (with no following u).
, however, is written with two letters in the native alphabet and hence  (gw). The lack of a single letter to represent this sound may result from its restricted distribution (only after ) and its rarity.
 is written þ, similarly to other Germanic languages.
"song" but   "faithful" (compare English "true").

Phonology
It is possible to determine more or less exactly how the Gothic of Ulfilas was pronounced, primarily through comparative phonetic reconstruction. Furthermore, because Ulfilas tried to follow the original Greek text as much as possible in his translation, it is known that he used the same writing conventions as those of contemporary Greek. Since the Greek of that period is well documented, it is possible to reconstruct much of Gothic pronunciation from translated texts. In addition, the way in which non-Greek names are transcribed in the Greek Bible and in Ulfilas's Bible is very informative.

Vowels

 ,  and  can be either long or short. Thus, the preterite of the verb briggan  "to bring" (English bring, Dutch brengen, German bringen) becomes brahta  (English brought, Dutch bracht,  German brachte), from Proto-Germanic *branhtē. In detailed transliteration, when the intent is more phonetic transcription, length is noted by a macron (or failing that, often a circumflex): brāhta, brâhta. This is the only context in which  appears natively whereas , like , is found often enough in other contexts: brūks "useful" (Dutch gebruik, German Gebrauch, Icelandic brúk "use").
They are written as e and o: neƕ  "near" (English nigh, Dutch nader, German nah); fodjan  "to feed".
They are noted using the digraphs ai and au: taihun  "ten" (Dutch tien, German zehn, Icelandic tíu), dauhtar  "daughter" (Dutch dochter, German Tochter, Icelandic dóttir). In transliterating Gothic, accents are placed on the second vowel of these digraphs aí and aú to distinguish them from the original diphthongs ái and áu: taíhun, daúhtar. Furthermore, the reduplication syllable of the reduplicating preterites has ai as well, which was probably pronounced as a short . Finally, short  and  occur in loan words from Greek and Latin (aípiskaúpus  =  "bishop", laíktjo  = lectio "lection", Paúntius  = Pontius).
The digraph  is in fact used to represent  in foreign words (such as Pawlus "Paul"), and alternations between / and / are scrupulously maintained in paradigms where both variants occur (e.g. taujan "to do" vs. past tense tawida "did"). Evidence from transcriptions of Gothic names into Latin suggests that the sound change had occurred very recently when Gothic spelling was standardized: Gothic names with Germanic au are rendered with au in Latin until the 4th century and o later on (Austrogoti > Ostrogoti).
In detailed transcription these are notated ai, au.
  (pronounced like German ü and French u) is a Greek sound used only in borrowed words. It is transliterated as w (as it uses the same letter that otherwise denoted the consonant ): azwmus  "unleavened bread" ( < Gk. ). It represents an υ (y) or the diphthong οι (oi), both of which were pronounced  in the Greek of the time. Since the sound was foreign to Gothic, it was perhaps pronounced .
  is a falling diphthong (: diups  "deep" (Dutch diep, German tief, Icelandic djúpur).
Ulfilas notes them, in words borrowed from Greek, as aw and aiw, probably pronounced : Pawlus  "Paul" (Gk. ), aíwaggelista  "evangelist" (Gk. , via the Latin evangelista).
It seems likely that this is more of an instance of phonetic juxtaposition than of true diphthongs (such as, for example, the sound  in the French word paille ("straw"), which is not the diphthong  but rather a vowel followed by an approximant): alew  "olive oil" ( < Latin oleum), snáiws  ("snow"), lasiws  "tired" (English lazy).

Consonants

In general, Gothic consonants are devoiced at the ends of words. Gothic is rich in fricative consonants (although many of them may have been approximants; it is hard to separate the two) derived by the processes described in Grimm's law and Verner's law and characteristic of Germanic languages. Gothic is unusual among Germanic languages in having a  phoneme, which has not become  through rhotacization. Furthermore, the doubling of written consonants between vowels suggests that Gothic made distinctions between long and short, or geminated consonants: atta  "dad", kunnan  "to know" (Dutch kennen, German kennen "to know", Icelandic kunna).

Stops
 The letter q is probably a voiceless labiovelar stop, comparable to the Latin qu: qiman  "to come". In later Germanic languages, this phoneme has become either a consonant cluster  of a voiceless velar stop + a labio-velar approximant (English qu) or a simple voiceless velar stop  (English c, k)
Like the other Germanic languages, they occurred in word-initial position, when doubled and after a nasal. In addition, they apparently occurred after other consonants,: arbi  "inheritance", huzd  "treasure". (This conclusion is based on their behavior at the end of a word, in which they do not change into voiceless fricatives, unlike when they occur after a vowel.)
 There was probably also a voiced labiovelar stop, which was written with the digraph gw. It occurred after a nasal, e.g. saggws  "song", or long as a regular outcome of Germanic *ww: triggws  "faithful" (English true, German treu, Icelandic tryggur).
 Similarly, the letters ddj, which is the regular outcome of Germanic *jj, may represent a voiced palatal stop, : waddjus  "wall" (Icelandic veggur), twaddje  "two (genitive)" (Icelandic tveggja).

Fricatives
The latter corresponds to Germanic *z (which has become r or silent in the other Germanic languages); at the end of a word, it is regularly devoiced to s. E.g. saíhs  "six", máiza  "greater" (English more, Dutch meer, German mehr, Icelandic meira) versus máis  "more, rather".
It is likely that the relatively unstable sound  became . f and þ are also derived from b and d at the ends of words and then are devoiced and become fricatives: gif  "give (imperative)" (infinitive giban: German geben), miþ  "with" (Old English mid, Old Norse með, Dutch met, German mit). The cluster  became  in some words but not others: þlauhs "flight" from Germanic *flugiz; þliuhan "flee" from Germanic *fleuhaną (but see flōdus "river", flahta "braid"). This sound change is unique among Germanic languages.
  is written as h: haban "to have". It was probably pronounced  in word-final position and before a consonant as well (not , since  >  is written g, not h): jah  "and" (Dutch, German, Scandinavian ja "yes").
In some borrowed Greek words is the special letter x, which represents the Greek letter χ (ch): Xristus  "Christ" (Gk. ).
In the study of Germanic languages, these phonemes are usually transcribed as ƀ, đ and ǥ respectively: haban  "to have", þiuda  "people" (Dutch Diets,  German Deutsch, Icelandic þjóð > English Dutch), áugo  "eye" (English eye, Dutch oog, German Auge, Icelandic auga).
It was probably pronounced  (a voiceless ), as wh is pronounced in certain dialects of English and in Scots: ƕan  "when", ƕar  "where", ƕeits  "white".

Sonorants
Gothic has three nasal consonants, one of which is an allophone of the others, all found only in complementary distribution with them. Nasals in Gothic, like most other languages, are pronounced at the same point of articulation as the consonant that follows them (assimilation).
  is not a phoneme and cannot appear freely in Gothic. Following Greek conventions, it is normally written as g (sometimes n): þagkjan  "to think", sigqan  "to sink" ~ þankeiþ  "thinks". The cluster ggw sometimes denotes , but sometimes  (see above).
  is transliterated as w before a vowel: weis  ("we"), twái  "two" (German zwei).
  is written as j: jer  "year", sakjo  "strife".
  and  occur as in other European languages: laggs (possibly ,  or ) "long", mel  "hour" (English meal, Dutch maal, German Mahl, Icelandic mál).
It is probable that the sounds are pronounced partly or completely as syllabic consonants in such circumstances (as in English "bottle" or "bottom"): tagl  or  "hair" (English tail, Icelandic tagl), máiþms  or  "gift", táikns  or  "sign" (English token, Dutch teken, German Zeichen, Icelandic tákn) and tagr  or  "tear (as in crying)".

Accentuation and intonation
Accentuation in Gothic can be reconstructed through phonetic comparison, Grimm's law, and Verner's law. Gothic used a stress accent rather than the pitch accent of Proto-Indo-European.

Just as in other Germanic languages, the free moving Proto-Indo-European accent was replaced with one fixed on the first syllable of simple words. Accents do not shift when words are inflected. In most compound words, the location of the stress depends on the type of compound:

 In compounds in which the second word is a noun, the accent is on the first syllable of the first word of the compound.
 In compounds in which the second word is a verb, the accent falls on the first syllable of the verbal component. Elements prefixed to verbs are otherwise unstressed except in the context of separable words (words that can be broken in two parts and separated in regular usage such as separable verbs in German and Dutch). In those cases, the prefix is stressed.

For example, with comparable words from modern Germanic languages:
 Non-compound words: marka  "border, borderlands" (English march, Dutch mark); aftra  "after"; bidjan  "pray" (Dutch, bidden, German bitten, Icelandic biðja, English bid).
 Compound words:
 Noun first element: guda-láus  "godless".
 Verb second element: ga-láubjan  "believe" (Dutch geloven, German glauben < Old High German g(i)louben by syncope of the unaccented i).

Grammar

Morphology

Nouns and adjectives

Gothic preserves many archaic Indo-European features that are not always present in modern Germanic languages, in particular the rich Indo-European declension system. Gothic had nominative, accusative, genitive and dative cases, as well as vestiges of a vocative case that was sometimes identical to the nominative and sometimes to the accusative. The three genders of Indo-European were all present. Nouns and adjectives were inflected according to one of two grammatical numbers: the singular and the plural.

Nouns can be divided into numerous declensions according to the form of the stem: a, ō, i, u, an, ōn, ein, r, etc. Adjectives have two variants, indefinite and definite (sometimes indeterminate and determinate), with definite adjectives normally used in combination with the definite determiners (such as the definite article sa/þata/sō) while indefinite adjectives are used in other circumstances., Indefinite adjectives generally use a combination of a-stem and ō-stem endings, and definite adjectives use a combination of an-stem and ōn-stem endings. The concept of "strong" and "weak" declensions that is prevalent in the grammar of many other Germanic languages is less significant in Gothic because of its conservative nature: the so-called "weak" declensions (those ending in n) are, in fact, no weaker in Gothic (in terms of having fewer endings) than the "strong" declensions (those ending in a vowel), and the "strong" declensions do not form a coherent class that can be clearly distinguished from the "weak" declensions.

Although descriptive adjectives in Gothic (as well as superlatives ending in -ist and -ost) and the past participle may take both definite and indefinite forms, some adjectival words are restricted to one variant. Some pronouns take only definite forms: for example, sama (English "same"), adjectives like unƕeila ("constantly", from the root ƕeila, "time"; compare to the English "while"), comparative adjective and present participles. Others, such as áins ("some"), take only the indefinite forms.

The table below displays the declension of the Gothic adjective blind (English: "blind"), compared with the an-stem noun guma "man, human" and the a-stem noun dags "day":

This table is, of course, not exhaustive.  (There are secondary inflexions of various sorts not described here.) An exhaustive table of only the types of endings that Gothic took is presented below.

 vowel declensions:
 roots ending in -a, -ja, -wa (masculine and neuter): equivalent to the Greek and Latin second declension in ‑us / ‑ī and ‑ος / ‑ου;
 roots ending in -ō, -jō and -wō (feminine): equivalent to the Greek and Latin first declension in ‑a / ‑ae and ‑α / ‑ας (‑η / ‑ης);
 roots ending in -i (masculine and feminine): equivalent to the Greek and Latin third declension in ‑is / ‑is (  ‑ī,   -ium) and ‑ις / ‑εως;
 roots ending in -u (all three genders): equivalent to the Latin fourth declension in ‑us / ‑ūs and the Greek third declension in ‑υς / ‑εως;
 n-stem declensions, equivalent to the Greek and Latin third declension in ‑ō / ‑inis/ōnis and ‑ων / ‑ονος or ‑ην / ‑ενος:
 roots ending in -an, -jan, -wan (masculine);
 roots ending in -ōn and -ein (feminine);
 roots ending in -n (neuter): equivalent to the Greek and Latin third declension in ‑men / ‑minis and ‑μα / ‑ματος;
 minor declensions: roots ending in -r, -nd and vestigial endings in other consonants, equivalent to other third declensions in Greek and Latin.

Gothic adjectives follow noun declensions closely; they take same types of inflection.

Pronouns

Gothic inherited the full set of Indo-European pronouns: personal pronouns (including reflexive pronouns for each of the three grammatical persons), possessive pronouns, both simple and compound demonstratives, relative pronouns, interrogatives and indefinite pronouns. Each follows a particular pattern of inflection (partially mirroring the noun declension), much like other Indo-European languages. One particularly noteworthy characteristic is the preservation of the dual number, referring to two people or things; the plural was used only for quantities greater than two. Thus, "the two of us" and "we" for numbers greater than two were expressed as wit and weis respectively. While proto-Indo-European used the dual for all grammatical categories that took a number (as did Classical Greek and Sanskrit), most Old Germanic languages are unusual in that they preserved it only for pronouns.  Gothic preserves an older system with dual marking on both pronouns and verbs (but not nouns or adjectives).

The simple demonstrative pronoun sa (neuter: þata, feminine: so, from the Indo-European root *so, *seh2, *tod; cognate to the Greek article ὁ, ἡ, τό and the Latin istud) can be used as an article, allowing constructions of the type definite article + weak adjective + noun.

The same etymology is present in the interrogatives of many other Indo-European languages: w-  in German, hv- in Danish, the Latin qu- (which persists in modern Romance languages), the Greek τ- or π-, the Slavic and Indic k- as well as many others.

Verbs

The bulk of Gothic verbs follow the type of Indo-European conjugation called 'thematic' because they insert a vowel derived from the reconstructed proto-Indo-European phonemes *e or *o between roots and inflexional suffixes. The pattern is also present in Greek and Latin:
Latin - leg-i-mus ("we read"): root leg- + thematic vowel -i- (from *o) + suffix -mus.
Greek - λύ-ο-μεν ("we untie"): root λυ- + thematic vowel -ο- + suffix -μεν.
Gothic - nim-a-m ("we take"):  root nim- + thematic vowel -a- (from *o) + suffix -m.

The other conjugation, called 'athematic', in which suffixes are added directly to roots, exists only in unproductive vestigial forms in Gothic, just like in Greek and Latin. The most important such instance is the verb "to be", which is athematic in Greek, Latin, Sanskrit, and many other Indo-European languages.

Gothic verbs are, like nouns and adjectives, divided into strong verbs and weak verbs. Weak verbs are characterised by preterites formed by appending the suffixes -da or -ta, parallel to past participles formed with -þ / -t. Strong verbs form preterites by ablaut (the alternating of vowels in their root forms) or by reduplication (prefixing the root with the first consonant in the root plus aí) but without adding a suffix in either case. This parallels the Greek and Sanskrit perfects. The dichotomy is still present in modern Germanic languages:
 weak verbs ("to have"):
 Gothic: haban, preterite: habáida, past participle: habáiþs;
 English: (to) have, preterite: had, past participle: had;
 German: haben, preterite: hatte, past participle: gehabt;
 Icelandic: hafa, preterite: hafði, past participle: haft;
 Dutch: hebben, preterite: had, past participle: gehad;
 Swedish: ha(va), preterite: hade, supine: haft;
 strong verbs ("to give"):
 Gothic: infinitive: giban, preterite: gaf;
 English: infinitive: (to) give, preterite: gave;
 German: infinitive: geben, preterite: gab;
 Icelandic: infinitive: gefa, preterite: gaf;
 Dutch: infinitive: geven, preterite: gaf;
 Swedish: infinitive: giva (ge), preterite: gav.

Verbal conjugation in Gothic have two grammatical voices: the active and the medial; three numbers: singular, dual (except in the third person) and plural; two tenses: present and preterite (derived from a former perfect); three grammatical moods: indicative, subjunctive (from an old optative form) and imperative as well as three kinds of nominal forms: a present infinitive, a present participle, and a past passive. Not all tenses and persons are represented in all moods and voices, as some conjugations use auxiliary forms.

Finally, there are forms called 'preterite-present': the old Indo-European perfect was reinterpreted as present tense. The Gothic word wáit, from the proto-Indo-European *woid-h2e ("to see" in the perfect), corresponds exactly to its Sanskrit cognate véda and in Greek to ϝοἶδα. Both etymologically should mean "I have seen" (in the perfect sense) but mean "I know" (in the preterite-present meaning). Latin follows the same rule with nōuī ("I have learned" and "I know"). The preterite-present verbs include áigan ("to possess") and kunnan ("to know") among others.

Syntax

 Word order 
The word order of Gothic is fairly free as is typical of other inflected languages. The natural word order of Gothic is assumed to have been like that of the other old Germanic languages; however, nearly all extant Gothic texts are translations of Greek originals and have been heavily influenced by Greek syntax.

Sometimes what can be expressed in one word in the original Greek will require a verb and a complement in the Gothic translation; for example, διωχθήσονται (diōchthēsontai, "they will be persecuted") is rendered:
{|
|wrakos||winnand||(2 Timothy 3:12)
|-
|persecution--||suffer-
|-
|colspan=3|"they will suffer persecution"
|}
Likewise Gothic translations of Greek noun phrases may feature a verb and a complement. In both cases, the verb follows the complement, giving weight to the theory that basic word order in Gothic is object–verb. This aligns with what is known of other early Germanic languages.

However, this pattern is reversed in imperatives and negations:
{|
|waírþ||hráins||(Matthew 8:3, Mark 1:42, Luke 5:13)
|-
|become-||clean
|-
|colspan=3|"become clean!"
|}

{|
|ni||nimiþ||arbi||(Galatians 4:30)
|-
|not||take-||inheritance
|-
|colspan=4|"he shall not become heir"
|}
And in a wh-question the verb directly follows the question word:
{|
|ƕa||skuli||þata||barn||waírþan||(Luke 1:66)
|-
|what||shall--||the-||child||become-
|-
|colspan=6|"What shall the child become?"
|}

Clitics
Gothic has two clitic particles placed in the second position in a sentence, in accordance with Wackernagel's Law.

One such clitic particle is -u, indicating a yes–no question or an indirect question, like Latin -ne:

{|
|ni-u||taíhun||þái||gahráinidái||waúrþun?||(Luke 17:17)
|-
|not-||ten||that--||cleanse---||become--
|-
|colspan=6|"Were there not ten that were cleansed?"
|}
{|
|ei||saíƕam||qimái-u||Helias||nasjan||ina||(Matthew 27:49)
|-
|that||see-||come---||Elias||save-||he-
|-
|colspan=7|"that we see whether or not Elias will come to save him"
|}

The prepositional phrase without the clitic -u appears as af þus silbin: the clitic causes the reversion of originally voiced fricatives, unvoiced at the end of a word, to their voiced form; another such example is wileid-u "do you want" from wileiþ "you want". If the first word has a preverb attached, the clitic actually splits the preverb from the verb: ga-u-láubjats "do you both believe...?" from galáubjats "you both believe".

Another such clitic is -uh "and", appearing as -h after a vowel: ga-h-mēlida "and he wrote" from gamēlida "he wrote", urreis nim-uh "arise and take!" from the imperative form nim "take".  After iþ or any indefinite besides sums "some" and anþar "another", -uh cannot be placed; in the latter category, this is only because indefinite determiner phrases cannot move to the front of a clause. Unlike, for example, Latin -que, -uh can only join two or more main clauses. In all other cases, the word jah "and" is used, which can also join main clauses.

More than one such clitics can occur in one word: diz-uh-þan-sat ijōs "and then he seized them" from dissat "he seized" (notice again the voicing of diz-), ga-u-ƕa-sēƕi "whether he saw anything" from gasēƕi "he saw".

Comparison to other Germanic languages
For the most part, Gothic is known to be significantly closer to Proto-Germanic than any other Germanic language except for that of the (scantily attested) Ancient Nordic runic inscriptions, which has made it invaluable in the reconstruction of Proto-Germanic. In fact, Gothic tends to serve as the primary foundation for reconstructing Proto-Germanic. The reconstructed Proto-Germanic conflicts with Gothic only when there is clearly identifiable evidence from other branches that the Gothic form is a secondary development.

Distinctive features
Gothic fails to display a number of innovations shared by all Germanic languages attested later:
 lack of Germanic umlaut,
 lack of rhotacism.

The language has also preserved many features that were mostly lost in other early Germanic languages:
 dual inflections on verbs,
 morphological passive voice for verbs,
 reduplication in the past tense of Class VII strong verbs,
 clitic conjunctions that appear in second position of a sentence in accordance with Wackernagel's Law, splitting verbs from pre-verbs.

Lack of umlaut
Most conspicuously, Gothic shows no sign of morphological umlaut. These forms contain the characteristic change  >  (English),  >  (German),  >  (ON and Danish) due to i-umlaut; the Gothic form shows no such change.

Lack of rhotacism
Proto-Germanic *z remains in Gothic as z or is devoiced to s. In North and West Germanic, *z changes to r by rhotacism:
 Gothic ,    ≠
 Old English ,    "wild animal" (Modern English deer).

Passive voice
Gothic retains a morphological passive voice inherited from Indo-European but unattested in all other Germanic languages except for the single fossilised form preserved in, for example, Old English hātte or Runic Norse haitē "am called", derived from Proto-Germanic *haitaną "to call, command". (The related verbs heißen in modern German and heten in Dutch are both derived from the active voice of this verb but have the passive meaning "to be called" alongside the dated active meaning "to command".)

The morphological passive in North Germanic languages (Swedish gör "does", görs "is being done") originates from the Old Norse middle voice, which is an innovation not inherited from Indo-European.

Dual number
Unlike other Germanic languages, which retained dual numbering only in some pronoun forms, Gothic has dual forms both in pronouns and in verbs. Dual verb forms exist only in the first and second person and only in the active voice; in all other cases, the corresponding plural forms are used. In pronouns, Gothic has first and second person dual pronouns: Gothic and Old English wit, Old Norse vit "we two" (thought to have been in fact derived from *wi-du literally "we two").

Reduplication
Gothic possesses a number of verbs which form their preterite by reduplication, another archaic feature inherited from Indo-European. While traces of this category survived elsewhere in Germanic, the phenomenon is largely obscured in these other languages by later sound changes and analogy. In the following examples the infinitive is compared to the third person singular preterite indicative:

 Gothic saian "to sow" : saiso
 Old Norse sá : seri < Proto-Germanic *sezō
 Gothic laikan "to play" : lailaik
 Old English lācan : leolc, lēc

Classification
The standard theory of the origin of the Germanic languages divides the languages into three groups: East Germanic (Gothic and a few other very scantily-attested languages), North Germanic (Old Norse and its derivatives, such as Swedish, Danish, Norwegian, Icelandic, and Faroese) and West Germanic (all others, including Old English, Old High German, Old Saxon, Old Dutch, Old Frisian and the numerous modern languages derived from these, including English, German, and Dutch). Sometimes, a further grouping, that of the Northwest Germanic languages, is posited as containing the North Germanic and West Germanic languages, reflecting the hypothesis that Gothic was the first attested language to branch off.

A minority opinion (the so-called Gotho-Nordic hypothesis) instead groups North Germanic and East Germanic together. It is based partly on historical claims: for example, Jordanes, writing in the 6th century, ascribes to the Goths a Scandinavian origin. There are a few linguistically significant areas in which Gothic and Old Norse agree against the West Germanic languages.

Perhaps the most obvious is the evolution of the Proto-Germanic *-jj- and *-ww- into Gothic ddj (from Pre-Gothic ggj?) and ggw, and Old Norse ggj and ggv ("Holtzmann's Law"), in contrast to West Germanic where they remained as semivowels. Compare Modern English true, German treu, with Gothic triggws, Old Norse tryggr.

However, it has been suggested that these are, in fact, two separate and unrelated changes. A number of other posited similarities exist (for example, the existence of numerous inchoative verbs ending in -na, such as Gothic ga-waknan, Old Norse vakna; and the absence of gemination before j, or (in the case of old Norse) only g geminated before j, e.g. Proto-Germanic *kunją > Gothic kuni (kin), Old Norse kyn, but Old English cynn, Old High German kunni). However, for the most part these represent shared retentions, which are not valid means of grouping languages. That is, if a parent language splits into three daughters A, B and C, and C innovates in a particular area but A and B do not change, A and B will appear to agree against C. That shared retention in A and B is not necessarily indicative of any special relationship between the two.

Similar claims of similarities between Old Gutnish (Gutniska) and Old Icelandic are also based on shared retentions rather than shared innovations.

Another commonly-given example involves Gothic and Old Norse verbs with the ending -t in the 2nd person singular preterite indicative, and the West Germanic languages have -i.  The ending -t can regularly descend from the Proto-Indo-European perfect ending *-th₂e, while the origin of the West Germanic ending -i (which, unlike the -t-ending, unexpectedly combines with the zero-grade of the root as in the plural) is unclear, suggesting that it is an innovation of some kind, possibly an import from the optative. Another possibility is that this is an example of independent choices made from a doublet existing in the proto-language.  That is, Proto-Germanic may have allowed either -t or -i to be used as the ending, either in free variation or perhaps depending on dialects within Proto-Germanic or the particular verb in question. Each of the three daughters independently standardized on one of the two endings and, by chance, Gothic and Old Norse ended up with the same ending.

Other isoglosses have led scholars to propose an early split between East and Northwest Germanic. Furthermore, features shared by any two branches of Germanic do not necessarily require the postulation of a proto-language excluding the third, as the early Germanic languages were all part of a dialect continuum in the early stages of their development, and contact between the three branches of Germanic was extensive.

Polish linguist Witold Mańczak had argued that Gothic is closer to German (specifically Upper German) than to Scandinavian and suggests that their ancestral homeland was located southernmost part of the Germanic territories, close to present-day Austria rather than in Scandinavia. Frederik Kortlandt has agreed with Mańczak's hypothesis, stating: "I think that his argument is correct and that it is time to abandon Iordanes' classic view that the Goths came from Scandinavia."

Influence 

Other examples include the French broder (to embroider), from Gothic *𐌱𐍂𐌿𐌶𐌳𐍉𐌽 (*bruzdon, "to embroider"); gaffe (gaffe), from Gothic 𐌲𐌰𐍆𐌰𐌷 (gafāh, "catch; something which is caught"); and the Italian bega (quarrel, dispute), from Gothic *𐌱𐌴𐌲𐌰 (*bēga, "quarrel").

Use in Romanticism and the Modern Age

J. R. R. Tolkien
Several linguists have made use of Gothic as a creative language. The most famous example is "" ("Flower of the Trees") by J. R. R. Tolkien, part of Songs for the Philologists. It was published privately in 1936 for Tolkien and his colleague E. V. Gordon.
 
Tolkien's use of Gothic is also known from a letter from 1965 to Zillah Sherring. When Sherring bought a copy of Thucydides' History of the Peloponnesian War in Salisbury, she found strange inscriptions in it; after she found his name in it, she wrote him a letter and asked him if the inscriptions were his, including the longest one on the back, which was in Gothic. Tolkien also made a calque of his own name in Gothic in the letter, which according to him should be .

Gothic is also known to have served as the primary inspiration for Tolkien's invented language, Taliska which, in his legendarium, was the language spoken by the race of Men during the First Age before being displaced by another of his invented languages, Adûnaic. , Tolkien's Taliska grammar has not been published.

Others
On 10 February 1841, the  published a reconstruction in Gothic of the Creed of Ulfilas.

The Thorvaldsen museum also has an alliterative poem, "", from 1841 by Massmann, the first publisher of the Skeireins, written in the Gothic language. It was read at a great feast dedicated to Thorvaldsen in the Gesellschaft der Zwanglosen in Munich on July 15, 1841. This event is mentioned by Ludwig von Schorn in the magazine  from the 19th of July, 1841. Massmann also translated the academic commercium song  into Gothic in 1837.

In , an online magazine for art and literature, the poem  of Dutch poet Bert Bevers appeared in a Gothic translation.

Alice in Wonderland has been translated into Gothic by David Carlton in 2015 and is published by Michael Everson.

Examples

See also
 Geats
 Gutes
 List of Germanic languages
 Modern Gutnish
 Name of the Goths
 Old Gutnish
 Thurneysen's law

References

Sources 
 G. H. Balg: A Gothic grammar with selections for reading and a glossary. New York: Westermann & Company, 1883 (archive.org).
 G. H. Balg: A comparative glossary of the Gothic language with especial reference to English and German. New York: Westermann & Company, 1889  (archive.org).
 
 W. Braune and E. Ebbinghaus, Gotische Grammatik, 17th edition 1966, Tübingen
 20th edition, 2004.   (hbk),  (pbk)
 Fausto Cercignani, "The Development of the Gothic Short/Lax Subsystem", in Zeitschrift für vergleichende Sprachforschung, 93/2, 1979, pp. 272–278.
 Fausto Cercignani, "The Reduplicating Syllable and Internal Open Juncture in Gothic", in Zeitschrift für vergleichende Sprachforschung, 93/1, 1979, pp. 126–132.
 Fausto Cercignani, "The Enfants Terribles of Gothic 'Breaking': hiri, aiþþau, etc.", in The Journal of Indo-European Studies, 12/3–4, 1984, pp. 315–344.
 Fausto Cercignani, "The Development of the Gothic Vocalic System", in Germanic Dialects: Linguistic and Philological Investigations, edited by Bela Brogyanyi and Thomas Krömmelbein, Amsterdam and Philadelphia, Benjamins, 1986, pp. 121–151.
 N. Everett, "Literacy from Late Antiquity to the early Middle Ages, c. 300–800 AD", The Cambridge Handbook of Literacy, ed. D. Olson and N. Torrance (Cambridge, 2009), pp. 362–385.
 Carla Falluomini, "Traces of Wulfila's Bible Translation in Visigothic Gaul", Amsterdamer Beiträge zur älteren Germanistik 80 (2020) pp. 5-24.
 W. Krause, Handbuch des Gotischen, 3rd edition, 1968, Munich.
 Thomas O. Lambdin, An Introduction to the Gothic Language, Wipf and Stock Publishers, 2006, Eugene, Oregon.
 
 F. Mossé, Manuel de la langue gotique, Aubier Éditions Montaigne, 1942
 E Prokosch, A Comparative Germanic Grammar, 1939, The Linguistic Society of America for Yale University.
 Irmengard Rauch, Gothic Language: Grammar, Genetic Provenance and Typology, Readings, Peter Lang Publishing Inc; 2nd Revised edition, 2011
 C. Rowe, "The problematic Holtzmann’s Law in Germanic", Indogermanische Forschungen, Bd. 108, 2003. 258–266.
 

 Wilhelm Streitberg, Die gotische Bibel , 4th edition, 1965, Heidelberg
 Joseph Wright, Grammar of the Gothic language, 2nd edition, Clarendon Press, Oxford, 1966
 2nd edition, 1981 reprint by Oxford University Press,

External links

 Gotisch im WWW Portal for information on Gothic (in German)
 Germanic Lexicon Project – early (Public Domain) editions of several of the references.
 Texts:
 The Gothic Bible in Latin alphabet
 The Gothic Bible in Ulfilan script (Unicode text) from Wikisource
 Titus has Streitberg's Gotische Bibel and Crimean Gothic material after Busbecq.
 Wulfila Project
 Skeireins Project A website with the Skeireins including translations in Latin, German, French, Swedish, English, Dutch, Greek, Italian and Icelandic.
 Gothic Online by Todd B. Krause and Jonathan Slocum, free online lessons at the Linguistics Research Center at the University of Texas at Austin
 Gothic Readings Video clips in Gothic language
 Gothic basic lexicon at the Global Lexicostatistical Database
 Gotica Bononiensa A page with information about the discovered Bononiensa fragment from 2013
 glottothèque - Ancient Indo-European Grammars online, an online collection of introductory videos to Ancient Indo-European languages produced by the University of Göttingen

 
East Germanic languages
Extinct languages of Europe
Extinct languages of Spain
Gothic writing
Languages attested from the 4th century
Languages of France
Languages of Italy
Languages of Poland
Languages of Portugal
Languages of Romania
Languages of Russia
Languages of Slovakia
Languages of the Czech Republic
Languages of Ukraine
Medieval languages